Midnight on the Water is an album by David Bromberg.  His fourth album, it was released by Columbia Records as a vinyl LP in 1975.  It was released in CD format by Sony Records in 1994, and by SBME Special Markets in 2009.  It was also released as a double CD, combined with Bromberg's previous album Wanted Dead or Alive, by BGO Records in 2010.

Critical reception

Writing in Driftwood Magazine in 2011, Craig Harris said, "Produced by Brian Ahern (Anne Murray, Emmylou Harris) and Bernie Leadon (formerly with the Flying Burrito Brothers and the Eagles), Midnight On The Water remains a milestone in the history of Americana. Tighter arrangements and a well-rehearsed band made this a genre-hopping smorgasbord of bluegrass, country, 1950s pop, and Celtic fiddle tunes. Showing equal dexterity on guitar and fiddle, Bromberg frames 10 cover tunes and 1 original ("The Joke's on Me") with a historic collection of awe-inspiring players and singers. Members of his then-touring band, including pennywhistle/clarinet player Billy Novick, fiddler/mandolinist Jay Ungar, violin/viola player Evan Stover, guitarist/fiddler/bassist Hugh McDonald, drummer Steve Mosley and cornet/trumpet/mellophone player and arranger Peter Ecklund, set a foundation that continues to stand 35 years later, while an amazing array of guests including Jesse Ed Davis (guitar), Mac "Dr. John" Rebennack (piano), Buddy Cage and "Red" Rhodes (pedal steel) and backup singers Bonnie Raitt, Emmylou Harris, Linda Ronstadt, Doyle Lawson, Ricky Skaggs and Lyn Hardy add the spice."

Track listing
Side one:
"(What a) Wonderful World" (Sam Cooke, Lou Adler, Herb Alpert) – 3:23 
"Yankee's Revenge: Medley" (traditional) – 5:55
"I Like to Sleep Late in the Morning" (David Blue) – 3:26
"Nobody's" (Gary White) – 4:58
Side two:
"Don't Put That Thing on Me" (Clifford Gibson) – 2:52
"Mr. Blue" (DeWayne Blackwell) – 2:55
"Dark Hollow" (Bill Browning) – 2:59
"If I Get Lucky" (Booker T. Washington)– 4:03
"The Joke's on Me" (David Bromberg) – 3:32
"Midnight on the Water" (traditional) – 4:27

Personnel

Musicians
David Bromberg – guitar, dobro, fiddle, mandolin, vocals
Murray Adler – violin
Brian Ahern – guitar
Buddy Cage – pedal steel guitar
Joe Darensbourg – clarinet
Jesse Ed Davis – guitar
Julie Dougal – violin
Dr. John – piano
Peter Ecklund – trumpet, cornet, flugelhorn, mellophone
Dick Fegy – guitar, violin
Paul Fleisher – saxophone, penny whistle
James Getzoff – violin
Ann Goodman – cello
Lyn Hardy – vocals
Emmylou Harris – vocals
John Herald – vocals
Brantley Kearns – violin, vocals
Doyle Lawson – vocals
Bernie Leadon – guitar
Hugh McDonald – bass
Steve Mosley – drums
Billy Novick – clarinet, penny whistle
Tony Posk – violin
Bonnie Raitt – vocals
Red Rhodes – pedal steel guitar
Linda Ronstadt – vocals
Haim Shtrum – violin
Ricky Skaggs – vocals
Evan Stover – violin, viola
Streamline – trombone
Jay Ungar – fiddle, mandolin
Lyndon Ungar – vocals
Ernie Watts – saxophone

Production
Produced by: Brian Ahern, Bernie Leadon
Engineers: Brian Ahern, Chris Skene, Paul Skene, Charlie Tallent, Stuart Taylor
Art direction: Lisa Sparagano
Design: Andy Engel
Photography: Al Clayton

References

David Bromberg albums
1975 albums
albums produced by Brian Ahern (producer)
Columbia Records albums